Erik Tysse (born 4 December 1980 in Bergen) is a Norwegian race walker. He has competed at four editions of the World Championships in Athletics and represented Norway at the 2008 Summer Olympics and at the 2012 Summer Olympics.

He began his international career at the 1998 World Junior Championships in Athletics, and finishing in 17th place at his first major event – the 2002 European Athletics Championships. He finished ninth in the men's 20 km race at the 2006 IAAF World Race Walking Cup, but set a Norwegian record of 1:20:34 in the process. He was one of the top performers on the circuit in 2007 and finished second in the rankings in the IAAF World Race Walking Challenge that year. Tysse improved upon his past performance, finishing in sixth place at the 2008 IAAF World Race Walking Cup, and he also improved his national mark to 1:19:11.

Repeating his 2008 victory, he won the 2010 Grande Premio Internacional en Marcha Atletica meeting in Rio Maior, beating Yohann Diniz to the finish line. He stated his intent to reach the podium at the upcoming 2010 European Athletics Championships.

Tysse is the younger brother of Kjersti Plätzer and is coached by her husband Stephan Plätzer. His idol is Jefferson Pérez.

Doping 
On 8 July  2010 Tysse was suspended from all competitions, after findings of CERA (EPO) in his blood tests from Sesto San Giovanni in Italy. Tysse has professed his innocence.
He received a two-year ban for doping and the sanction was confirmed by the Court of Arbitration for Sport. The ban ended 7 July 2012.

Achievements

References

External links

Profiles of 2007 World Championships athletes - Norwegian Athletics Association 

1980 births
Living people
Norwegian male racewalkers
Norwegian sportspeople in doping cases
Doping cases in athletics

Athletes (track and field) at the 2008 Summer Olympics
Athletes (track and field) at the 2012 Summer Olympics
Athletes (track and field) at the 2016 Summer Olympics
Olympic athletes of Norway
People from Os, Hordaland
World Athletics Championships athletes for Norway
Sportspeople from Vestland